The 10th District of the Iowa House of Representatives in the state of Iowa.

Current elected officials
Mike Sexton is the representative currently representing the district.

Past representatives
The district has previously been represented by:
 Chuck Grassley, 1971–1973
 Richard W. Welden, 1973–1983
 Richard L. Groth, 1983–1987
 Russell Eddie, 1987–2003
 Jim Kurtenbach, 2003–2007
 Dave Deyoe, 2007–2013
 Tom W. Shaw, 2013–2015
 Mike Sexton, 2015–present

References

010